Hanna Sola (born 16 February 1996) is a Belarusian biathlete. She has competed in the Biathlon World Cup.

She won the bronze medal in the 7.5 km sprint at the Biathlon World Championships 2021 in Pokljuka.

Biathlon results
All results are sourced from the International Biathlon Union.

Olympic Games

World Championships
1 medal (1 bronze)

*During Olympic seasons competitions are only held for those events not included in the Olympic program.
**The single mixed relay was added as an event in 2019.

References

External links

1996 births
Living people
People from Shumilina District
Belarusian female biathletes
Biathlon World Championships medalists
Biathletes at the 2022 Winter Olympics
Olympic biathletes of Belarus
Sportspeople from Vitebsk Region